Imaginations (sometimes stylized as imaginations) is the fifth studio album by Fantastic Plastic Machine. It was released on February 22, 2006. It peaked at number 38 on the Oricon Albums Chart.

Track listing

Charts

References

External links
 

2006 albums
Fantastic Plastic Machine (musician) albums
Avex Group albums